Ioan Drăgan (2 December 1965 – 2 January 2012) was a Romanian footballer who played 169 matches for FC Brașov.

Career
Drăgan began his football career with ICIM Braşov. In 1990, he joined FC Braşov and would spend most of his playing career with the club.

References

1965 births
2012 deaths
Romanian footballers
Liga I players
Liga II players
FC Brașov (1936) players
Association football defenders